The British Library Syriac Manuscript Collection is one of the largest collections of Syriac manuscripts in the world. It contains 1,075 manuscripts and 12,000 printed books. The manuscripts are dated between 450 and 2000.

See also
List of the Syriac New Testament manuscripts

References

Syriac manuscripts